Tshepo Ngwane (21 July 1976 – 27 October 2015) was a South African actor most famous for his role as Thiza on South African television drama series Yizo Yizo.

References 

1976 births
2015 deaths
South African male television actors
People from Soweto